Nieuwe Sluis is a Dutch lighthouse in the Nieuwesluis community, a few kilometres west of Breskens, Zeeland, and the southernmost in the country.

History
Designed by Quirinus Harder, it was built between 1866 and 1867. The octagonal, black and white tower marks the entrance to the Westerschelde. It is part of a series of lights marking the end of the Schelde river and guide traffic between the North Sea and the harbor of Antwerp.

Nieuwe Sluis is the oldest extant cast iron lighthouse in the Netherlands after the one in Renesse was demolished in 1915. Initially it was yellow, then it received red-white bands, before it was painted black and white. The lens assembly was made by the French company of Barbier, Bénard & Turenne, and includes a copper cupola. Initially it was the first in a series of leading lights. During World War II the lighthouse was deactivated and covered in camouflage paint; it was not reactivated until 1951.

Originally the lighthouse stood on top of the dike, but when that dike was raised as part of the Delta Works the lighthouse ended up on the seaside.

Since 2010 it no longer serves a nautical purpose and in October 2011 the light went out permanently. Alternative uses for the building were investigated. In 2012 ownership was transferred from the Belgian government to a foundation, and in 2014 that foundation was granted E20,000 by Dow Benelux for repairs and renovations.

See also

List of lighthouses in the Netherlands

References

External links

 Stichting Vuurtoren Breskens

Lighthouses completed in 1867
1867 establishments in the Netherlands
Lighthouses in the Netherlands
Towers in Zeeland
Rijksmonuments in Zeeland
Sluis
19th-century architecture in the Netherlands